Christopher Brian McCombs (born 25 August 1980) is an American actor and model. He is the creator, star, writer, and producer of the Japanese on demand series The Benza and its spin off series Benza English on Amazon Prime Video. He is known for portraying Michael in the Netflix original series Followers, and for stage roles such as Hoteye in the live action production of Fairy Tail. McCombs is fluent in Japanese, and has won several acting awards for his performances in English and Japanese alike.

Early life
McCombs was born in Geneva, Ohio and moved to Cleveland with his mother, teacher Karen Callahan, at a young age. He began acting and modeling professionally in high school at the age of fifteen when his gifted education teacher pushed him into auditioning for shows.

He credits his father, David McCombs, for his interest in the Japanese language.  When he was a child, his father bought him and his brother a Super Famicom and he began playing video games in Japanese.  This led to his interest in formally studying the language as an adult.

Career
McCombs moved to Tokyo, Japan in 2010 after studying Japanese at the College of Southern Nevada and University of Las Vegas. Though he initially went to Tokyo to work as a model, he began working in variety television shows and appeared regularly on MX Television's Go Ji Ni Muchu for a year. In addition, McCombs appeared as a regular cast member on educational television shows like NHK E Television’s EiEiGo!, Shigoto no Kiso Eigo, and Omotenashi no Kiso Eigo.

In 2016, in both the Chinese and Japanese stage production of the manga series Fairy Tail, McCombs portrayed the character Hoteye. In 2020, McCombs played the recurring role of Michael in the Netflix series Followers.

Since 2017, McCombs appears weekly as the host of Television Asahi’s Kodawari Navi. He appears as himself semi-regularly as a guest commentator on NHK1’s Bento Expo. He occasionally works as a reporter for NHK World on JTrip Japan.

McCombs is the creator, writer, and star of The Benza, a Japanese on demand television series which began streaming in 2019. Additionally, he created the spin-off series Benza English in 2020, and wrote the story and dialog for a retro RPG video game based on The Benza, called The Benza RPG.

Tokyo Cowboys
In 2015, McCombs founded the Tokyo-based independent production company Tokyo Cowboys to help create better roles for foreigners wanting to work in entertainment in Japan, regardless of race, gender, or sexual preference. McCombs acts as both producer and head script writer.

Though originally focused on making short films, like the award-winning LGBT short “The Actor and the Model”, Tokyo Cowboys began making serialized entertainment in 2019 with The Benza on Amazon Prime Video.

He is quoted by SoraNews24 as saying, "I had only been here for six years but I had already realized that the quality of roles for foreigners in Japan were not (and are not) very good. Lost gaijin, loud gaijin, rude gaijin...To make matters worse, there is a lot of confusion in Japanese culture as to who is 'talento' [celebrities who often appear on TV as themselves] and who is an 'actor.' So, when you are appearing as an actor and playing the fool, it is often mistaken for 'talento.' People assume you are...a fool."

Filmography

Television

Film

Video Games

Theater

Awards 
Able to perform in both Japanese and English, McCombs has won several awards for his acting. Most notably, he won Best Actor for his role in the Japanese short film The Actor and the Model at Formosa Festival of International Film in Taiwan as well as the Rising Star award at the 2018 Seoul Webfest in Korea and the Best Actor award at the 2019 edition for his leading role in the television series The Benza.

References

External links

1980 births
Living people
American television writers
American male television writers
American male television actors
American television producers
Male models from Ohio
American expatriates in Japan
American television personalities
Expatriate television personalities in Japan
American male video game actors
21st-century American male actors